The Port Said Port Authority (PSPA) is a government agency of Egypt, charged with the responsibility to govern, regulate and develop the port facilities in the vicinity of Port Said in the Mediterranean Sea, on the northern terminus of the Suez Canal.  Principal port areas of Port Said include: 
 Port Said West Port
 Port Said East Port
 El Arish Port

The original port at Port Said was built in 1859, expanding gradually by the decade. After the October 1973 War many ships began to call and the government of Egypt experienced a rise in contractual penalties it had to pay to shipping companies due to tardy service and congestion at the harbour.  Consequently, its facilities began a period of great expansion.  Today it is a competitive world port. 

Port Said East Port is the location of the new, modern Suez Canal Container Terminal.

See also
Transport in Egypt

References

External links
Port Said Port Authority
Port Said Container and Cargo Handling, a state corporation of Egypt
Egyptian Maritime Data Bank, a service of the government of Egypt

Government agencies of Egypt
Water transport in Egypt
Port Said
Suez Canal
Port authorities
Mediterranean ports and harbors of Egypt